This is a list of radio stations that broadcast in Mauritius.

General

Mauritius online radio stations

Rodrigues Island

See also 
 Media of Mauritius
 List of radio stations
 List of Indian-language radio stations
 List of Chinese-language radio stations

References

External links
Radio station in Mauritius Live Stream

Mauritius
Radio stations